The streaky-breasted spiderhunter (Arachnothera affinis) is a species of bird in the family Nectariniidae.
It is found in Java and Bali.  Its natural habitats are subtropical or tropical moist lowland forests and subtropical or tropical moist montane forests. It is sometimes considered conspecific with the grey-breasted spiderhunter.

References

streaky-breasted spiderhunter
Birds of Java
Birds of Bali
streaky-breasted spiderhunter